The climate in urban areas differs from that in neighboring rural areas, as a result of urban development. Urbanization greatly changes the form of the landscape, and also produces changes in an area's air. The study of urban climate is urban climatology.

In 1950 Åke Sundborg published one of the first theories on the climate of cities.

Temperature 
Increased urban land use and occupation alters the local thermal field resulting in the development of warmer regions known as urban heat islands (UHIs). An urban heat island is a phenomenon where these surface temperature deviations and air in the lowest levels of the atmosphere are concentrated in urban areas and those immediately downwind, and often are more pronounced at night than during the day, rather than surrounding suburban and especially rural areas. The solar energy absorbed and produced from solar radiation and anthropogenic activity is partitioned accordingly: warming the air above the surface via convection, evaporating moisture from the urban surface system, and storing heat in surface materials, such as buildings and roads. The solar energy is stored during the day and typically released during the night. Dark materials making up the buildings, impermeable soil and paved surfaces retain a majority of the solar energy. This allows for larger heat islands and increased thermal discomfort. Surface reflectivity in urban areas can impact ambient temperature. When the vegetative surface is dark and dry it can reach , whereas when the land is light and moist it reaches . Water evaporation usually helps to release energy from vegetative surfaces to cool the surface above. But most hotspot locations have little greenery which influences the formation of urban heat islands. Darker man-made surfaces have a lower albedo and heat capacity than natural surfaces allowing for increased photochemical reaction rates and absorption of visible radiation. This phenomenon can also be exacerbated when people release waste heat via heating and ventilating systems (e.g. air conditioners) and vehicular emissions. Expansion of these urban areas can lead to higher surface and air temperatures contributing to urban climate.

Precipitation 
Because cities are warmer, the warmer air is apt to rise, and if the humidity is high it can cause convectional rainfall – short intense bursts of rain and thunderstorms. 

Urban areas produce particles of dust (notably soot) and these act as hygroscopic nuclei which encourages rain production and otherwise affect convection via cloud microphysics. 

Because of the warmer temperatures there is less snow in the city than surrounding areas.

Winds 
Wind speeds are often lower in cities than the countryside because the buildings act as barriers (wind breaks). On the other hand, tall buildings can act as wind tunnels in which winds funneled between the structures. This effect can be exacerbated on longer streets with suitable buildings properly oriented to the wind direction. The gusty winds around buildings also leads to (eddying).

Humidity 
Cities usually have a lower relative humidity than the surrounding air because cities are hotter, and rainwater in cities is unable to be absorbed into the ground to be released into the air by evaporation, and transpiration occurs much less since cities contain little vegetation relative to rural areas. Surface runoff is usually taken up directly into the subterranean sewage water system and thus vanishes from the surface immediately. Better understanding of urban temperature and water vapor contributions and/ or loss will reveal the reasons for lower relative humidity within cities, especially since relative humidity is dependent on temperature changes.

See also
 Air pollution
 Urban studies

References

Climate
Physical geography
Regional climate effects
Urbanization